The  was a national junior college in the city of Kyoto, Japan.

History 

The college opened in 1975, affiliated with Kyoto University, and consisted of four departments. It closed in 2007.

Courses

It offered courses in nursing, medical laboratory science, physiotherapy, occupational therapy, and midwifery.

External links 
 College of Medical Technology, Kyoto University 

Educational institutions established in 1975
Educational institutions disestablished in 2007
Japanese junior colleges
1975 establishments in Japan
Universities and colleges in Kyoto Prefecture
Japanese national universities
2007 disestablishments in Japan